Jalan Jenderal Sudirman or  Jalan Sudirman (Sudirman Road) is a major thoroughfare in Jakarta, Indonesia. Named after Indonesian national hero Sudirman, the road runs from Patung Pemuda Membangun at the south end to the bridge of the West Flood Canal to the north, where it meets Jalan M.H. Thamrin. The road had been built between 1949 and 1953 to connect Central Jakarta with Kebayoran Baru.

Transportation
A part of Jakarta MRT runs underneath the total length of Jalan Jenderal Sudirman. Four stations of the MRT (Senayan, Istora Mandiri, Bendungan Hilir, and Setiabudi Astra) located along this road. Sudirman station of KRL Commuterline, BNI City station of Soekarno–Hatta Airport Rail Link, and the upcoming Dukuh Atas station of Greater Jakarta LRT are located at the north end of the road as a part of Dukuh Atas TOD.

There are six stops for the TransJakarta busway along the street, mainly serving Corridor 1. They are:
 Bundaran Senayan, in front of Ratu Plaza
 Gelora Bung Karno, close to gate into Gelora Bung Karno
 Polda Metro Jaya, close to Polda Metro Jaya police headquarters
 Bendungan Hilir, close to Plaza Semanggi and the Semanggi Interchange which connects this street to Jalan Jenderal Gatot Subroto
 Karet Sudirman, close to Wisma Metropolitan and Le Méridien Hotel
 Dukuh Atas, close to Wisma 46, in front of Wisma Arthaloka.

See also

Jalan Gajah Mada and Jalan Hayam Wuruk
Menteng
History of Jakarta

References

Cited works

Central business districts in Indonesia
Roads of Jakarta
Central Jakarta